Gerardo Vargas Hurtado (1869–1941) was a Peruvian journalist born in Arica.  He was also a playwright, historian, founder of the newspaper El Ariqueño and a journalist of the newspaper El Morro de Arica published until 1911.

Biography
Vargas was born in Arica to Miguel Vargas and Raymunda Hurtado, when the city was part of the Arica Province of Peru.

He was the founder of the newspaper El Ariqueño and a journalist for the newspaper El Morro de Arica which was published until 1911. He was a member of the Geographical Society of Lima. In 1896 he was elected secretary of the Peruvian Universal Fraternity lodge of Arica.

In March 1904, on the occasion of the 14th anniversary of El Morro de Arica, Vargas indicated that the newspaper was founded with the exclusive purpose of defending Peruvian interests in these territories as well as local commerce.

He participated in the journalistic field in the plebiscite campaigns of 1925 and 1926 in favor of Peru for the former provinces of Tacna and Arica to rejoin Peruvian territory. In 1925, some chapters of his book La Batalla de Arica, were published aboard the Ucayali, a Peruvian ship off the Arican coast. In 1929, as a result of the Treaty of Lima, his native Arica became definitely a Chilean province.

See also
 Arica Province (Peru)
 Tacna Province (Chile)
 Treaty of Ancón
 Treaty of Lima
 War of the Pacific

Notes

References

1869 births
1932 deaths
Peruvian journalists
Freemasons
Male journalists
Peruvian male writers